Henry Taswell (28 July 1830 – 12 July 1874) was an English first-class cricketer.

The son of George Morris Taswell, he was born in July 1830 at Canterbury. He was educated at Rugby School, before going up to Christ Church, Oxford. While studying at Oxford, he made a single appearance in first-class cricket for Oxford University against Cambridge University in The University Match at Lord's in 1851. Batting twice in the match, he ended the Oxford first innings unbeaten on a single run, while following-on in their second innings he was dismissed for 13 runs by Charles Pontifex. He later emigrated to Canada, where he died at Sherbrooke in July 1874. His brother, Edward, was also a first-class cricketer.

References

External links

1830 births
1874 deaths
People from Canterbury
People educated at Rugby School
Alumni of Christ Church, Oxford
English cricketers
Oxford University cricketers
English emigrants to Canada